Laser Blast is a single-player video game developed and published by Activision in March 1981 for the Atari VCS console (renamed to Atari 2600 in 1982). Designed by David Crane, one of Activision's co-founders, Laser Blast places players in control of flying saucers attacking land targets.

Gameplay
The object of Laser Blast is to destroy a series of land-based enemies. The player controls a fleet of flying saucers, operating one at a time. On the planet surface below are a group of three mobile laser bases, guarded by an invisible force field that prevents the player's saucer from getting too close to the surface. Both the player and the enemy bases are armed with laser blasters, which may fire a single continuous beam at a time. If the player's saucer is hit, it will lose altitude and crash to the ground; however, the player may direct this fall, potentially into one of the bases, destroying it as well. Each succeeding wave of enemy bases moves faster and targets the player's saucers more quickly, while the force field becomes stronger and decreases the amount of space in which the saucer can move.

Players score points for each base destroyed, with points multiplying each wave up to a maximum of 90 points per base. Players earn extra flying saucers with each 1000 points scored and may keep a maximum of six extra saucers in reserve.

Players who scored 100,000 points or more could submit photographic proof to Activision and be admitted to the Activision Federation of Laser Blasters. When the score of 999,999 is reached, the digits in the score turn to exclamation points, and the game ends.

Reception
Laser Blast earned an Honorable Mention for "Best Science Fiction Game" in 1982 at the Third Annual Arkie Awards.

Legacy
Activision re-released Laser Blast as part of its Activision Anthology video game, made available for a number of consoles at various times in the 2000s.

See also

List of Atari 2600 games
List of Activision games: 1980–1999

References

External links
 Laser Blast at AtariAge
 Laser Blast at Atari Mania

1981 video games
Activision games
Atari 2600 games
Atari 2600-only games
Shoot 'em ups
Video games developed in the United States